Miracle Bell are an Indie pop band from Naas, Ireland. Formed in 2005 the band is composed of John Broe (Guitar, lead vocals and Synth) and John Rigney(Drums, Percussion and Backing vocals).

History
Miracle Bell formed in late 2005. Originally they started as a rock covers band called When In Rome.

Singer Dave and guitarist John are first cousins. They have released one album in Ireland called Light Shape Sound, and have also released six singles. On 27 February 2011, Miracle Bell appeared on RTÉ on The All Ireland Talent Show, performing their single "Love Sounds".

On 17 November 2011, Dave Prendergast left Miracle Bell after six years with the band.

Band members
 John Broe - Guitar, lead vocals & Synth
 John Rigney - Drums & Backing vocals

Former members
 Tom Barrett – Bass (2005–2010)
 Dave Prendergast - Lead Vocals, Rhythm Guitar & Synth (2005–2011)

Discography

Studio albums

Extended plays

Singles

References

Irish indie rock groups
Irish electronic music groups
Musical groups established in 2005
Musical groups from County Kildare